The BLS RABe 515, also known as MUTZ, is a class of bilevel electric multiple units manufactured by Stadler Rail for BLS AG. It is a derivative of the Stadler KISS. Formations are composed of four or six cars. They were the first bilevel cars used by BLS.

History 
BLS planned to use the cars on various Bern S-Bahn routes. The first trains entered service on 19 September 2012. All 28 trains were in service by the December 2014 timetable change. BLS ordered three more trainsets in 2015, also for use on S-Bahn routes. Five of these use an extended six-car formation.

Design 
The four-car trains have seating for 335 passengers; the six-car trains can accommodate 546.

In both formations there are cabs at the front and rear ends. The four-car formation has a single car with split first class and second class seating, with the six-car formation has two such cars. Passengers sit on both levels of the cars. The cars are low floor. Stairs at each end of each car permit access to the gangway between cars and to the upper level.

Operation 
, the BLS RABe 515 is used on the S1, S3, S31, and S6 of the Bern S-Bahn, and on the Bern–Biel/Bienne and Bern–Olten InterRegio services.

Notes

References

External links 

 RABe 515 – Double-decker train "MUTZ"

Stadler KISS
Multiple units of Switzerland
Train-related introductions in 2012
15 kV AC multiple units